Lari may refer to:
 Lari language (Iran), or Achomi, a language of Iran
 Lari dialect (Sindhi), a dialect of the Sindhi language of Pakistan
 Lari language (Congo), a variety of the Kongo language of Congo

See also 
 Luri language, Iran
 Luri language (West Chadic), Nigeria
 Laarim language, South Sudan